is a public art college run by the city of Osaka. It is called OMCD for short. OMCD was founded in 1988 as an institution of continuous vocational education and is a sister institution to the Osaka City Kogei High School.

Issue with  given link to website.

Notes

External links
 Osaka Municipal College of Design 

Art schools in Japan
Universities and colleges in Osaka
Public Japanese vocational colleges